Lennart Silfverstolpe (27 June 1888 – 4 August 1969) was a Swedish tennis player. He competed in the men's indoor singles event at the 1912 Summer Olympics.

References

External links
 

1888 births
1969 deaths
Swedish male tennis players
Olympic tennis players of Sweden
Tennis players at the 1912 Summer Olympics
People from Enköping
Sportspeople from Uppsala County
20th-century Swedish people